Marco Antonio Nazareth (12 April 1986 – 22 July 2009) was a Mexican professional boxer.

Professional career
Nazareth began his professional career in 2005, and until 2009 he racked up a record of four wins and three losses in seven bouts. 
In Guadalajara, Jalisco Marco received his first loss to a future IBF Lightweight Champion, Mexican Miguel Vazquez.

Death
On July 18, 2009, he fought for the second time with Omar Chávez, son of Julio César Chávez in Puerto Vallarta, Jalisco. He lost the bout via a 4th round TKO, then he collapsed in the ring and had to be taken to the local hospital where he underwent a three-hour surgery to treat a cerebral hemorrhage. He died four days later.

References

External links
 

Boxers from Jalisco
People from Puerto Vallarta
Sport deaths in Mexico
Deaths due to injuries sustained in boxing
1986 births
2009 deaths
Mexican male boxers
Light-welterweight boxers